Rocío Sánchez Moccia (born 2 August 1988) is an Argentine field hockey player. She competed for the Argentina national team and winning the silver medal, at the 2012 Summer Olympics, and winning the silver medal at the 2020 Summer Olympics.

Career 
Rocío has also won three Champions Trophy, the World League 2014–15, the bronze medal at the 2014 World Cup in The Hague, Netherlands and three Pan American Cups.

References

External links 
 

Living people
Field hockey players from Buenos Aires
Argentine female field hockey players
Olympic field hockey players of Argentina
Field hockey players at the 2012 Summer Olympics
Olympic medalists in field hockey
Las Leonas players
Olympic silver medalists for Argentina
Medalists at the 2012 Summer Olympics
Pan American Games silver medalists for Argentina
Argentine people of Italian descent
Field hockey players at the 2011 Pan American Games
Field hockey players at the 2015 Pan American Games
1988 births
Field hockey players at the 2016 Summer Olympics
Field hockey players at the 2020 Summer Olympics
Pan American Games medalists in field hockey
Female field hockey midfielders
Mannheimer HC players
Feldhockey Bundesliga (Women's field hockey) players
Club de Campo Villa de Madrid players
Medalists at the 2011 Pan American Games
Medalists at the 2015 Pan American Games
Medalists at the 2020 Summer Olympics
Competitors at the 2022 South American Games
South American Games silver medalists for Argentina
South American Games medalists in field hockey
21st-century Argentine women